Winsor may refer to:

Places
 Winsor, Hampshire, England
 Winsor, Newfoundland and Labrador, Canada
 Winsor Township (disambiguation), United States

People 
 Winsor (surname)
 Winsor Harmon (born 1963), American actor best known for his role as Thorne Forrester on the American soap opera The Bold and the Beautiful. He took over the role from Jeff Trachta in December 1996
 Alfred Winsor (1880–1961), American ice hockey coach and amateur ice hockey player. Winsor coached ice hockey at Harvard University between 1903 and 1917
 Earl Winsor (1918–1989), master mariner and politician in Newfoundland. He represented Labrador North from 1956 to 1971 and Fogo from 1971 to 1979 in the Newfoundland House of Assembly
 Frank E. Winsor (1870–1939), civil engineer, chief engineer for the Boston Metropolitan District Water Supply Commission from 1926, closely involved in the design and construction of Winsor Dam and Goodnough Dike built by the Commission to create the Quabbin Reservoir in Massachusetts
 George McLeod Winsor (1856–1939), British writer
 Hugh Winsor (born 1938), CM, Canadian journalist, noted for his work with The Globe and Mail and CBC Television's The Journal
 Naboth Winsor (1916–1997), Newfoundland historian, born on Winsor's Island 
 Nathan G. Winsor (1892–1959), business manager and politician in Newfoundland. He represented Bonavista North in the Newfoundland House of Assembly from 1930 to 1932
 Ray Winsor (1933–2006), dentist and politician in Newfoundland. He represented Mount Scio from 1975 to 1979 in the Newfoundland House of Assembly
 Richard Winsor (born 1982), British actor and dancer, played Dr. Caleb Knight in Casualty
 Robert Winsor (1858–1930), leading American financier, investment banker, and philanthropist who, as head of the Boston investment banking firm Kidder, Peabody & Co., was at the forefront of industrial consolidation during the period leading up to the Great Depression
 Robert G. Winsor (1876–1929), fisherman and political figure in Newfoundland. He represented Bonavista Bay from 1913 to 1924 and Bonavista North from 1928 to 1929 in the Newfoundland House of Assembly as a member of the Fishermen's Protective Union
 Roy Winsor (1912–1987), American soap opera writer, creator and novelist
 William C. Winsor (1876–1963), Canadian mariner and political figure in Newfoundland. He represented Bay de Verde from 1904 to 1908, Bonavista Bay from 1908 to 1913 and from 1924 to 1928 and Bonavista North from 1932 to 1934 in the Newfoundland and Labrador House of Assembly

Other uses
 Winsor Building, located in Asbury Park, Monmouth County, New Jersey, United States. The building was built in 1904 and was added to the National Register of Historic Places on September 13, 1979
 Winsor Dam, and the Goodnough Dike impound the waters of the Swift River and the Ware River Diversion forming the Quabbin Reservoir, the largest water body in Massachusetts
 Winsor Justin
 Winsor McCay Award, given to individuals in recognition of lifetime or career contributions in animation
 Winsor & Newton, a company based in London, UK that manufactures a wide variety of fine art products, including: oils, alkyds, watercolours, acrylics, pastels, artists' brushes, canvases, papers, portfolios, and distributes the Derwent pencil sets
 Winsor McCay (1869–1934), American cartoonist, originally named Zenas Winsor McKay
 Winsorising, as in a Winsorized mean (named after  Charles P. Winsor (1895–1951))
 Winsor School in Boston, Massachusetts
 House of Windsor, the royal house of the United Kingdom and the other Commonwealth realms

See also
Windsor (disambiguation)